Fun Lovin' Criminals is the eponymous debut EP by the band Fun Lovin' Criminals. It is also known as Original Soundtrack for Hi-Fi Living.

Track listing

 "Passive/Aggressive" - 3:36
 "Blues for Suckers" - 3:50
 "I Can't Get With That [Schmoove Version]" - 5:33
 "Coney Island Girl" - 1:30

Trivia
"Blues for Suckers" is actually a Schmoove Version of "Bear Hug", with singing instead of rapping.

References

1995 debut EPs
Fun Lovin' Criminals albums